Fuck You and Then Some (stylized as !!!Fuck You!!! and Then Some) is a 1996 reissue of the Overkill EPs Overkill (1985) and !!!Fuck You!!! (1987), combined with bonus live tracks, including a cover of Black Sabbath's "Hole in the Sky". The cover of this compilation album is the same as !!!Fuck You!!! with the addition of "And Then Some" to the title.

Track listing

Personnel
 Bobby "Blitz" Ellsworth – vocals
 D.D. Verni – bass
 Bobby Gustafson – guitars
 Rat Skates – drums (tracks 1-6, 9-12)
 Sid Falck – drums (tracks 7-8)

References

External links
 Official OVERKILL Site
 BORN IN THE BASEMENT- Thrash Metal/ Overkill History 
 Overkill artwork archive from Rat Skates 
 Overkill Lyrics

1996 compilation albums
Overkill (band) albums
Megaforce Records compilation albums
Thrash metal compilation albums